Duflot is a surname. Notable people with the surname include: 

Cécile Duflot (born 1975), French politician
Eugène Duflot (1885–1957), French sports shooter
Eugène Duflot de Mofras (1810–1884), French naturalist, botanist, and diplomat

See also
 Duflo
 Duflos

French-language surnames